Donald Ross Hayes, Jr. (born July 13, 1975) is a former American football wide receiver for the Carolina Panthers and New England Patriots of the National Football League. Hayes played college football at Wisconsin.

In 2003, Hayes signed with the Jacksonville Jaguars but was released following the preseason.

On May 31, 2006, Hayes signed with the Toronto Argonauts of the Canadian Football League and participated in their pre-season training camp. He was cut by the team on June 10, 2006.

References

External links
 ESPN page

1975 births
Living people
People from Century, Florida
Sportspeople from Madison, Wisconsin
Players of American football from Florida
Players of American football from Wisconsin
American football wide receivers
Wisconsin Badgers football players
Carolina Panthers players
New England Patriots players
Madison East High School alumni